This Isn't Funny is a 2015 romantic comedy movie directed by Paul Aston. It was produced in the United States by Easy Open Productions, Metropolitan Entertainment and Nut Bucket Films.

Plot

Eliot Anderson, a stand-up comic, and Jamie Thompson, a juice store manager, meet and work out their relationship with each other.  Each character also has family problems - especially with their parents.  Eliot has a psychiatrist who has medicated her for over 12 years. She doesn't like taking the pills and skips her dose occasionally.  Jamie's drugs are recreational, mostly alcohol and molly.

Cast

Katie Page as Elliot Anderson, a stand-up comic
Paul Ashton as Jamie Thompson, a juice bar manager
Edi Gathegi as Ryan, an artist and Jamie's roommate
Anthony LaPaglia as Mike
Mimi Rogers as Elaine Anderson, Elliot's mother
David Pasquesi as Christoffer Anderson, Elliott's father
Mark Harelik as Joseph Thompson, Jamie's father
Angie Milliken as Barbara Thompson, Jamie's mother
Gia Carides as Gillian Jones, famous comedian
Beth Stelling as Hannah, a stand-up comic and Elliot's best friend
Ahmed Bharoocha as Russ, a stand-up comic and bar manager

References

External links

2015 romantic comedy films
2015 films